Lucie Debay is a Belgian-French actress who has appeared in film, television and theatre.

Career 
After developing an interest in acting, Debay enrolled at the INSAS Film School in Brussels and graduated from there in 2009. She later began working in theatre and appeared in productions by directors such as Falk Richter, Armel Roussel, and Jean-Baptiste Calame. She also appears in films – her credits include Before the Winter Chill (2013), French Blood (2015), King of the Belgians (2016), Our Struggles (2018), Cleo (2018), and Madly in Life (2020).

For her role in Melody (2014), Debay was awarded the Magritte Award for Most Promising Actress.

Selected filmography

References

External links

21st-century Belgian actresses
Belgian film actresses
Belgian stage actresses
Belgian television actresses
Magritte Award winners
Living people
1985 births